Aliaksandra Khilmanovich (born 14 December 1996) is a Belarusian athlete. She competed in the women's 4 × 400 metres relay event at the 2020 Summer Olympics.

References

External links
 

1996 births
Living people
Belarusian female sprinters
Athletes (track and field) at the 2020 Summer Olympics
Olympic athletes of Belarus
Sportspeople from Grodno